Isodiametridae is a family of acoels.

Taxonomy

Genera
The following genera are recognised in the family Isodiametridae:

 Alluna Faubel & Regier, 1983
 Ancylocirrus Kozloff, 2000
 Aphanostoma Ørsted, 1845
 Archaphanostoma Dörjes, 1968
 Avagina Leiper, 1902
 Baltalimania Ax, 1959
 Bursosaphia Dörjes, 1968
 Diatomovora Kozloff, 1965
 Faerlea Westblad, 1945
 Haplocelis Dörjes, 1968
 Isodiametra Hooge & Tyler, 2005
 Otocelis Diesing, 1862
 Pharyngia Nilsson, Wallberg & Jondelius, 2011
 Postaphanostoma Dörjes, 1968
 Praeaphanostoma Dörjes, 1968
 Praeconvoluta Dörjes, 1968
 Proaphanostoma Dörjes, 1972
 Proconvoluta Dörjes, 1968
 Pseudaphanostoma Westblad, 1946
 Pseudoposthia Westblad, 1946
 Raphidophallus Kozloff, 1965
 Rimicola Bohmig, 1908

Species
There are over 100 species recognised in the family Isodiametridae:

Notes

References

Acoelomorphs